Negohot is an Israeli settlement in the southern Hebron Hills of the West Bank. Located on a hill 700 metres above sea level to the west of the Hebron area, it is organised as a community settlement and falls under the jurisdiction of Har Hevron Regional Council.

The nearest Israeli locality is Shekef, a moshav a few kilometres over the Green Line in the Hevel Lakhish area of the Shephelah. The international community considers Israeli settlements in the West Bank illegal under international law, but the Israeli government disputes this.

History
The village was first established in 1982 as a pioneer Nahal military outpost. In 1998, constraints of the Nahal brigade led to the village changing hands and being turned over hesder soldiers who volunteered for extra service to keep a residential presence on that hilltop. The soldiers renovated the area, built a beit midrash and eventually completed their army service and continued to raise families there.

On 25 September 2003, the night of Rosh Hashana, a Palestinian militant from Islamic Jihad killed two residents, including a seven-month-old baby girl, while the family was eating the festive holiday meal.

Many of the adult residents work outside the village, though some entrepreneurs have begun some local small businesses. The children of Negohot travel to the 'Dvir' elementary school in Otniel. Negohot receives assistance from the Amana settlement organization.

References

External links
Village website
Negohot  Amana
Negohot Peace Now

Religious Israeli settlements
Israeli settlements in the West Bank
Populated places established in 1982
Nahal settlements
1982 establishments in the Palestinian territories
Community settlements